Venets Municipality is a municipality (obshtina) in Shumen Province, Northeastern Bulgaria, located in the Ludogorie geographical region, part of the Danubian Plain. It is named after its administrative centre - the village of Venets.

Settlements 

Venets Municipality includes the following 13 places, all of them are villages:

Demography 
The following table shows the change of the population during the last four decades.

Ethnic composition
According to the 2011 census, among those who answered the optional question on ethnic identification, the ethnic composition of the municipality was the following:

The population is predominantly Turkish (89.0%), with Bulgarian (1.9%), Romani (7.9%) and other minorities (1.1%).

Religion
The municipality of Venets has the second highest share of Turks in Bulgaria with 89%, which makes it also the municipality with the second highest share of Muslims in Bulgaria, with 95% of its population belonging to the Islamic community. The small Bulgarian population is mostly Christian.

See also
Provinces of Bulgaria
Municipalities of Bulgaria
List of cities and towns in Bulgaria

References

External links
 Official website 

Municipalities in Shumen Province